The 1920 Giro d'Italia was the eighth edition of the Giro d'Italia, one of cycling's Grand Tours. The field consisted of 49 riders, and 10 riders finished the race.

References

1920 Giro d'Italia
1920